The Capital Premier League (formerly known as NPL ACT 2 or simply NPL2) is an association football competition contested by clubs affiliated to Capital Football. The league is the second highest level (level 2) competition in the Australian Capital Territory (ACT) region. It is a 2nd tier in ACT Capital Football and sits in Level 3 in the overall Australian league system. Prior to 2019, the league was known as the Capital League and was the top division of the ACT State League system and National Premier Leagues Capital Football 2.

History

Established in 1967 as Division 2 the level 2 division in the ACT has been competed every year except a three-year gap between 1984 and 1986, The league has been renamed three times prior to 2019 with the original Division 2 title changed to State League One in 1992 before becoming the Capital League in 2013.

1 August 2018, Capital Football announced a major overhaul of the local football structure with the top two divisions (level 1 and 2) linked with the introduction of promotion and relegation between the top two men's divisions. The top two leagues were re-branded from NPL Capital Football and the Capital League to NPL1 and NPL2.

3 August 2018, a group of current NPL clubs in the ACT raised concerns regarding the structure changes and the introduction of promotion and relegation. In particular the concern around governances was raised by Woden-Weston president Steve Rohan-Jones. While Canberra Olympic coach, Frank Cachia, raised the issues around juniors and the sustainability of an inter-state team if it gets relegated.

31 August 2018, Capital Football opened the application process for interested teams to apply to join the NPL1 and NPL2 leagues.

28 September 2018, Capital Football announced the successful applications for teams for the 2019 NPL season. NPL1 would consist of nine teams with seven teams selected for NPL2. Out of the ten teams that competed in the 2018 Capital League season, seven teams were successful in gaining NPL2 status while three teams, Narrabundah FC, Monaro Panthers reserves, and Canberra Olympic reserves were all unsuccessful. The bottom team of NPL1 in 2019 would be relegated to NPL2 for the 2020 season but no team from NPL2 would be promoted to even the two leagues to eight teams each.

Narrabundah FC lodged an official appeal supported by a number of other Capital Football affiliated clubs. Narrabundah's appeal was successful, and on 8 November 2018 Capital Football released a new declaration of leagues for the 2019 NPL level that included Narrabundah FC as an NPL2 participant.

15 November 2018, NSW regional club, Wagga City Wanderers, announced it was transferring from NSW State League to Capital Football and would join the NPL2 and NPLW leagues. This move resulted in both NPL1 and NPL2 leagues having nine teams each for the 2019 season.

Format

The regular season runs between April to September each year and consists of 16 rounds with four matches played each round and one team sitting out a bye. Each team plays each other twice (home and away) and sits out two byes over the course of the season. The top four teams qualify for the finals series (finals). The team that finishes first in the league standings is crowned league premiers and, from 2020, will be promoted to NPL1.

Finals is run over three weeks with the major (1 vs 2) and minor (3 vs 4) semi-finals held in the first week. The winner of the major semi-final progresses to the grand final in week 3 and the loser progresses to the preliminary final in week 2. The winner of the minor semi-final progresses to the preliminary final and the loser is eliminated.

Clubs

The inaugural season of NPL Capital Football 2 was originally planned to only have seven clubs, as published by Capital Football on 1 August 2018. After a successful appeal by Narrabundah a revised declaration of clubs for NPL level was released by Capital football on 8 August 2018 that increased the number of clubs from seven to eight. In November 2018, Wagga City Wanderers announced the club was leaving Football NSW and switching affiliation to Capital Football so the club's first grade team was added to NPL2 to bring the overall number up to nine (equal numbers with NPL1).

Eight of the inaugural season clubs were members of the previous ACT level two league (Capital league) in the previous season (2018). All nine inaugural season clubs were making their first appearance in the National Premier Leagues system, having previously competed in NSW and ACT State League systems.

Current Clubs
As of the 2023 Capital Football season, there are 8 clubs competing in the CPL.

Former Premier League or NPL 2 clubs

Honours

Capital Premier League seasons (2022–)

NPL2 seasons (2019–2021)

A snapshot of the NPL Capital Football 2 seasons since its inauguration in 2019.

Notes:
 1 ACT finals series cancelled due to the COVID-19 pandemic in Australia.

NPL2/Capital Premier League all-time record

Pre-NPL Honours

Pre-NPL seasons (1967–2018)

A snapshot of each ACT division two season between 1967 and 2018 before being aligned with the NPL in 2019.

Legend: BOLD = first league or finals title a club secures

Pre-NPL all-time record

Pre-NPL era Division 2 honours since 1967 till 2018, prior to the transition to NPL in 2019.

See also

Soccer in the Australian Capital Territory
Sport in the Australian Capital Territory

References

External links
Capital Premier League
NPL2 Fixtures/Results/Ladder/Stats

Soccer leagues in the Australian Capital Territory
Soccer in the Australian Capital Territory
Soccer in Canberra
National Premier Leagues